In computer science, a range minimum query (RMQ) solves the problem of finding the minimal value in a sub-array of an array of comparable objects. Range minimum queries have several use cases in computer science, such as the lowest common ancestor problem and the longest common prefix problem (LCP).

Definition 

Given an array  of  objects taken from a totally ordered set, such as integers, the range minimum query  (with ) returns the position of the minimal element in the specified sub-array .

Algorithms

Naive solution 

In a typical setting, the array  is static, i.e., elements are not inserted or deleted during a series of queries, and the queries to be answered on-line (i.e., the whole set of queries are not known in advance to the algorithm). In this case a suitable preprocessing of the array into a data structure ensures faster query answering. There are  possible queries for a length- array, and the answers to these can be computed in  time by dynamic programming.

Solution using constant time after linearithmic space pre-computation 

As in the solution above, answering queries in constant time will be achieved by pre-computing results. However, the array will store pre-computed range minimum queries not for every range , but only for ranges whose size is a power of two. Filling the table takes time , with the indices of minima using the following recurrence

If , then ;
else, .

The other is the query of an interval of the same length that has  as its right boundary. These intervals may overlap, but since we are trying to compute the minimum rather than, for example, the sum of the numbers in the array, this does not matter. The overall result can thus be obtained, after the linearithmic time pre-computing, in constant time: the two queries can be answered in constant time and the only thing left to do is to choose the smaller of the two results.

Solution using logarithmic time and linear space 
This solution answers RMQs in  time. Its data structures use  space and its data structures can also be used to answer queries in constant time. The array is first conceptually divided into blocks of size . Then the minimum for each block can be computed in  time overall and the minima are stored in a new array.

RMQs can now be answered in logarithmic time by looking at the blocks containing the left query boundary, the right query boundary and all the blocks in between:
 The two blocks containing the boundaries can be searched naïvely. Elements outside the boundary need not even be looked at. This can be done in logarithmic time.
 The minima of all blocks that are fully contained in the range, and the two minima mentioned above, need to be compared to answer the query.
 Because the array was divided into blocks of size , there are at most  blocks that are fully contained in the query.
 By using the linearithmic solution one can find the overall minimum among these blocks. This data structure has size .
 Now, only three minima need to be compared.

Solution using constant time and linear space 
Using the solution above, the sub-queries inside the blocks that are not fully contained in the query still need to be answered in constant time. There are at most two of those blocks: the block containing  and the block containing . Constant time is achieved by storing the Cartesian trees for all the blocks in the array. A few observations:
 Blocks with isomorphic Cartesian trees give the same result for all queries in that block
 Therefore, the number of different Cartesian trees for the blocks is in the range of 
For every such tree, the possible result for all queries need to be stored.

To look up results efficiently, the Cartesian tree (row) corresponding to a specific block must be addressable in constant time. The solution is to store the results for all trees in an array and find a unique projection from binary trees to integers to address the entries. This can be achieved by doing a breadth-first-search through the tree and adding leaf nodes so that every existing node in the Cartesian tree has exactly two children. The integer is then generated by representing every inner node as a 0-bit and every leaf as a 1-bit in a bit-word (by traversing the tree in level-order again). To enable random access in constant time to any tree, the trees not contained in the original array need to be included as well. An array with indices of  bits length has size .

Applications 
RMQs are used as a tool for many tasks in exact and approximate string matching. Several applications can be found in Fischer and Heun (2007).

Computing the lowest common ancestor in a tree 
RMQs can be used to solve the lowest common ancestor problem and are used as a tool for many tasks in exact and approximate string matching.
Gabow, Bentley, and Tarjan (1984) showed that the LCA Problem can be reduced in linear time to the RMQ problem. It follows that, like the RMQ problem, the LCA problem can be solved in constant time and linear space.

Computing the longest common prefix in a string 
To do this we first compute the suffix array , and the inverse suffix array . Once these data structures are computed, and RMQ preprocessing is complete, 
the length of the general LCP can be computed in constant time by the formula: , where we assume for simplicity that  (otherwise swap).

See also
 Range query (data structures)

References

External links
An article on Range Minimum Queries on TopCoder
Range Minimum Query article on PEGWiki / P3G
Stanford CS166 RMQ introduction slides

Search algorithms